Robert Adamson (17 May 1943 – 16 December 2022) was an Australian poet and publisher.

Biography
Born in Sydney, Adamson grew up in Neutral Bay and spent much of his teenage years in Gosford Boys Home for juvenile offenders. He discovered poetry while educating himself in gaol in his 20s. His first book, Canticles on the Skin, was published in 1970. He acknowledges the influence of, among others, Rimbaud, Mallarmé, and Hart Crane upon his writing. But also American poets such as Robert Duncan and Robert Creeley were important and influential contemporaries.

In the 1970s and 1980s, he edited New Poetry magazine and established Paper Bark Press in 1986 with his partner, photographer Juno Gemes, and writer Michael Wilding, which published Australian poetry. Wilding left the company in 1990, and Gemes and Adamson continued to run the company until 2002. 

In 2011 he won the Patrick White Award and the Blake Poetry Prize.

Adamson was appointed the inaugural CAL chair of poetry at UTS (University of Technology, Sydney) in 2012.

Death
Adamson died in palliative care (Neringah Hospital), Wahroonga, New South Wales on 16 December 2022, at the age of 79.

Works

Poetry
Canticles on the Skin. (Sydney: Illumination Press, 1970)
Cross The Border. (Sydney: Hale & Iremonger, 1977) 
Selected Poems. (Sydney: Angus & Robertson, 1977) 
Where I Come From. (Sydney: Big Smoke, 1979) 
The Clean Dark. (Sydney: Paper Bark, 1989) 
Waving to Hart Crane. (Sydney: Angus & Robertson, 1994)  
Black Water: Approaching Zukofsky. (Sydney: Brandl & Schlesinger, 1999) 
Mulberry Leaves: New & Selected Poems 1970-2001. (2001)  
Reading the River: Selected Poems (Bloodaxe Books, UK, 2004) 
The Goldfinches of Baghdad. (Flood Editions, USA, 2006)  
The Golden Bird: New and Selected Poems (Melbourne: Black Inc., 2008) 
The Kingfisher's Soul (Bloodaxe Books, UK, 2009) 
Empty Your Eyes. (Vagabond Press, 2013)
Net Needle. (Black Inc, 2015) . (Flood Editions, USA, 2015) . (Bloodaxe Books, UK, 2016) 
Garden Poem
Reaching Light: Selected Poems (Flood Editions, USA, 2020)

Autobiography
Zimmer's Essay. With Bruce Hanford (Sydney: Wild & Woolley, 1974) 
Wards of the State. (Sydney: Angus & Robertson, 1992) 
Inside Out. (Text, 2004)

Awards
1976: Grace Leven Prize for Poetry for Selected Poems
1990: C. J. Dennis Prize for Poetry for The Clean Dark
1990: Kenneth Slessor Prize for Poetry for The Clean Dark
1990: The Turnbull-Fox-Phillips Award (The National Book Council Banjo Award) for The Clean Dark
1994: FAW Christopher Brennan Award for lifetime achievement in literature
2004: New South Wales Premier's History Award for Inside Out
2007: The Age Book of the Year Poetry Prize for The Goldfinches of Baghdad
2007: Grace Leven Prize for Poetry for The Goldfinches of Baghdad
2011: Patrick White Award

References

External links 
Robert Adamson Official Website
The Flow Through: for the Johns
Poems at Poetry International Web
Interview with Robert Adamson
Reviews at Australian Literature Resources
Robert Adamson takes part in The Poetry Object
The Grace of Accuracy – Imagination and the Details Necessary: Robert Adamson on Poetry - a lecture Robert Adamson gave as CAL Chair of Australian Poetry at the University of Technology Sydney.

1943 births
2022 deaths
20th-century Australian poets
Poets from Sydney
People from the North Shore, Sydney
Australian autobiographers
Australian publishers (people)
Patrick White Award winners
Australian male poets
21st-century Australian poets
20th-century Australian male writers
21st-century Australian male writers